West Branch Otsdawa Creek is a river in Otsego County, New York. It converges with Otsdawa Creek north-northwest of Otego.

References

Rivers of New York (state)
Rivers of Otsego County, New York